CHI Memorial Stadium is a 2,500 seat soccer-specific stadium in East Ridge, Tennessee with a planned finished capacity of 5500. It was the first soccer specific stadium in Tennessee. It serves as the home stadium for Chattanooga Red Wolves SC of USL League One, Chattanooga Lady Red Wolves SC of the Women's Premier Soccer League, and Dalton Red Wolves SC of USL League Two.

The stadium opened on August 1, 2020 for the Red Wolves' match against FC Tucson.

History

On , the Red Wolves announced that the stadium would host their home opener of the 2020 season.

The stadium was originally scheduled to open on April 25, 2020 for the Red Wolves' match against Richmond Kickers, but was postponed due to the COVID-19 pandemic. Instead, the stadium opened on August 1, 2020 for the Red Wolves' match against FC Tucson.

In 2023 and 2024, the stadium will be the site for the semifinal and championship matches of both the NCAA Division II Men's Soccer Championship and the NCAA Division II Women's Soccer Championship.

References

Chattanooga Red Wolves SC
USL League One stadiums
Soccer venues in Tennessee
Sports venues completed in 2020
Sports venues in Chattanooga, Tennessee
2020 establishments in Tennessee